Gajaar: Journey of the Soul is a 2011 Indian Marathi-language drama film directed by Ajit Bhairavkar and produced by Sunil khosla. The film is revolving around film director Parth (Chinmay) and capture devotional movements of Wari.

Gajar is the first film in the history of Marathi cinema to be shot entirely using digital cameras.

Cast 

 Chinmay Mandlekar as Parth 
 Sukhada Yash as Geetali 
 Umesh Jagtap as Asurba 
 Edward Sonnenblick as Eric 
 Sanjeev Chopra as Producer Kapoor 
 Suhas Sirsat as Audya

Development 
The film Gajaar was shot in some pilgrimage centers of Maharashtra like Padharpur, Pune, Alandi due to its 'Wari' based story.

References

External links 
 
 Gajaar: Journey of the Soul at Rotten Tomatoes

2011 films
2011 drama films
Indian drama films
Marathi films remade in other languages
Religious drama films